Henricus tingomariae is a species of moth of the family Tortricidae. It is found in Peru.

The wingspan is about 34 mm for males and 37 mm for females. The ground colour of the forewings is cream, in the postmedian part tinged ochreous and in the basal part more ferruginous. The hindwings are whitish with dense greyish strigulae (fine streaks).

Etymology
The species name refers to Tingo María, the type locality.

References

Moths described in 2010
Henricus (moth)